The 2nd AIBA European 2004 Olympic Qualifying Tournament was held in Warsaw, Poland from March 30 to April 4, 2004 at the annual Feliks Stamm Boxing Tournament. The top two in each weight category gained entry into the 2004 Summer Olympics.

Medal winners

Qualified

Flyweight (– 51 kg)

Featherweight (– 57 kg)

Light Welterweight (– 64 kg)

Middleweight (– 75 kg)

Heavyweight (– 91 kg)

See also
2004 European Amateur Boxing Championships
1st AIBA European 2004 Olympic Qualifying Tournament
3rd AIBA European 2004 Olympic Qualifying Tournament
4th AIBA European 2004 Olympic Qualifying Tournament

References
amateur-boxing

European 2
2004 in Polish sport